Leif Yli (born 11 October 1942) is a Norwegian cyclist. He was born in Notodden. He competed at the 1968 Summer Olympics in Mexico City, where he placed fifth in team trial with the Norwegian team.

References

1942 births
Living people
People from Notodden
Norwegian male cyclists
Olympic cyclists of Norway
Cyclists at the 1968 Summer Olympics
Sportspeople from Vestfold og Telemark